This is a list of notable people who are from the Northwest Territories, Canada, or have spent a large part or formative part of their career in that territory.

A
Leona Aglukkaq, former member of Parliament for the electoral district of Nunavut
Roger Allen, former member of the Legislative Assembly of the Northwest Territories

B
Zac Boyer, former National Hockey League right winger
Tom Butters, former member of the Legislative Assembly of the Northwest Territories

C
 Mark Carney, governor of the Bank of England and former governor of the Bank of Canada

D
 Alex Debogorski, local truck driver and personality on Ice Road Truckers
 Paul Delorey, professional curler and former MLA and speaker in the Northwest Territories Legislature

E
Jason Elliott, former professional ice hockey player
Kingmeata Etidlooie, Inuk visual artist and sculptor

F 
 Alice Masak French, Inuk author

G
 Brendan Green, Canadian team biathlete; participated in the 2010 Winter Olympics in the men's 4x7.5 km relay
 Jane Groenewegen, former member of the Legislative Assembly of the Northwest Territories from Hay River South
 Leela Gilday, Juno Award-winning Dene singer/songwriter from Yellowknife

H 
 Sarah Hardisty, Dene elder and quillworker
 Courtney Howard, Physician and one0time leadership candidate, Green Party of Canada

K
 Helen Kalvak, Copper Inuit graphic artist 
 Margot Kidder, film and television actress best known for playing Lois Lane in the Superman movies of the 1970s and 1980s
 Fred Koe, former member of the Legislative Assembly of the Northwest Territories
 Kevin Koe, world champion curler
 Shane Koyczan, poet and spoken word artist
 Floyd Kuptana, Inuk sculptor

M
 Joe McBryan (Buffalo Joe), president and owner of Buffalo Airways featured on Ice Pilots NWT
 Mikey McBryan, Buffalo Airways General Manager and featured on Ice Pilots NWT
 Rob McVicar, professional ice hockey goaltender
 Tobias Mehler, film and television actor best known for his roles on Battlestar Galactica and Stargate SG-1
 Vic Mercredi, Métis hockey player, first person born in the NWT to be drafted into the National Hockey League
 Dustin Milligan, film and television actor; lead actor in the first season of the Beverly Hills, 90210 spinoff

N
 Melaw Nakehk'o, Dene artist and film actress, known for role in The Revenant (2015)
 Phoebe Nahanni, Dene geographer
 Agnes Nanogak, Inuit artist
 Leslie Nielsen, actor, comedian, and producer best known for his roles on The Forbidden Planet and  The Poseidon Adventure

P
 David Ruben Piqtoukun, Inuit artist and sculptor
 John Pollard, member of the Legislative Assembly of the Northwest Territories from 1987 until 1995

R
 Floyd Roland, Mayor of Inuvik; former Premier and member of the Legislative Assembly of the Northwest Territories

S
 Geoff Sanderson, former National Hockey League player
 Eric Schweig, Inuvialuit/Chippewa/Dene actor
 John Sissons, politician and the first judge of the Supreme Court of the Northwest Territories
 Donald Morton Stewart, former mayor and speaker of the Northwest Territories Legislature
 Les Stroud, filmmaker and survival expert; host of the television program Survivorman

T 
 Ovilu Tunnillie, Inuit sculptor, member of the Royal Canadian Academy of Arts

V
 Greg Vaydik, National Hockey League player

W
 Max Ward, pioneering bush pilot and founder of Wardair airlines (later sold to Canadian Airlines)

References